Class of 98 is the second album by American hardcore punk band, 98 Mute. It was released on June 2, 1998 on Theologian Records. Like its predecessor, the self-titled debut, it was produced by Fletcher Dragge of the band, Pennywise and one of the tracks, "Picture This", was featured on Epitaph Records' Punk-O-Rama series of compilations as they left to join them.

Overview
The style was considerably tamer than their debut effort with toned-down vocals and longer songs, all contributing to a more original sound. The songs were still played at a fast pace, but with more emphasis on melody and structure.

Track listing
All songs written by 98 Mute
"Ask Yourself"	–	2:33
"How Do You Feel Now?"	–	2:12
"Election Year"	–	2:42
"Breakdown"	–	2:30
"Shine"	–	2:50
"Great Expectations"	–	2:26
"Hangman"	–	1:32
"Growing Old"	–	1:56
"Perfect Sense"	–	2:39
"Slander"	–	2:44
"Short Fuse"	–	2:14
"Open Your Eyes"	–	2:54
"Picture This"	–	2:06
"Watch Over Me"	–	4:02

Credits
 Pat Ivie – vocals
 Jason Page – guitar
 Doug Weems – bass
 Justin Thirsk – drums
 Recorded in December, 1997 at Icebone, Redondo Beach, California, USA
 Produced by Fletcher Dragge
 Engineered by Darian Rundall
 Mixed by Fletcher Dragge and Darian Rundall at Total Access, Redondo Beach, California
 Mastered by Gene Grimaldi at Oasis Mastering

References

External links
98 Mute official website
Epitaph Records band page
Theologian Records website

1998 albums
98 Mute albums